Agroiconota is a genus of tortoise beetles in the family Chrysomelidae. There are more than 20 described species in Agroiconota.

Species
These 27 species belong to the genus Agroiconota:

 Agroiconota atromaculata Borowiec, 2005
 Agroiconota atropunctata Borowiec, 2005
 Agroiconota aulatipennis Spaeth, 1936
 Agroiconota bivittata (Say, 1827)
 Agroiconota carlobrivioi Borowiec, 2005
 Agroiconota conflagrata (Boheman, 1855)
 Agroiconota cubana Blake, 1970
 Agroiconota gibberosa (Boheman, 1855)
 Agroiconota gibbipennis Borowiec, 2005
 Agroiconota inedita (Boheman, 1855)
 Agroiconota judaica (Fabricius, 1781)
 Agroiconota lateripunctata Spaeth, 1936
 Agroiconota paraguayana Borowiec, 2005
 Agroiconota parellina Spaeth, 1937
 Agroiconota propinqua (Boheman, 1855)
 Agroiconota pullula (Boheman, 1855)
 Agroiconota punctipennis (Boheman, 1855)
 Agroiconota reimoseri Spaeth, 1936
 Agroiconota sanareensis Borowiec, 2005
 Agroiconota sodalis Spaeth, 1936
 Agroiconota stupidula (Boheman, 1855)
 Agroiconota subtriangularis Spaeth, 1936
 Agroiconota subvittata (Boheman, 1855)
 Agroiconota tristriata (Fabricius, 1792)
 Agroiconota urbanae Buzzi, 1996
 Agroiconota vilis (Boheman, 1855)
 Agroiconota vittifera Spaeth, 1936

References

Further reading

External links

 

Cassidinae
Articles created by Qbugbot